Vecna is a fictional character in Dungeons and Dragons, a roleplaying game.

Vecna may also refer to:

Businesses 
 Vecna Technologies, an American healthcare information technology company
 Vecna Robotics, an American industrial robotics and technology company

Television 
 Vecna, the main antagonist of Stranger Things Season 4